BDP may refer to:
 Boogie Down Productions, hip hop group
 Building Design Partnership, UK architects
 Bund der Pfadfinderinnen und Pfadfinder (BdP), German Scouting and Guiding organisation
 Bandwidth-delay product, the product of a data link's capacity and its round-trip delay time.

Political parties 

 Botswana Democratic Party, the governing political party in Botswana
 Conservative Democratic Party, a political party in Switzerland
 British Democratic Party (1979), a defunct far-right political party in the United Kingdom
 British Democratic Party (2013), an active far-right political party in the United Kingdom
 Peace and Democracy Party, a mainly Kurdish political party in Turkey existing from 2008 to 2014.